W254AZ (98.7 FM) is an FM translator station licensed to serve Belmont, North Carolina.

History
In August 2014, W254AZ began broadcasting a sports talk format from WRFX's HD-2 channel. This station was an affiliate of Fox Sports Radio, and was also heard on iHeartRadio. Jeff Kent was program director. The programming included Andy Furman and Mike North in the morning drive, Dan Patrick in the late morning and Steve Gorman in the afternoon.

On August 1, 2016, Martz Media Inc. began leasing the HD channel and translator, and flipped it to Spanish CHR as "Ke Buena 98.7".

At 8:00 p.m. on October 31, 2017, iHeartMedia re-assumed control of the HD2 channel and translator, and replaced the Spanish CHR format with an all-Christmas music format, "Christmas 98.7." On December 29, 2017, the station flipped to contemporary Christian as "UP! 98.7". "Christmas 98.7" would return to the station at the start of November for the 2018 and 2019 holiday seasons, with "UP! 98.7" returning after Christmas.

On June 29, 2020, fifteen iHeart stations in markets with large African American populations, including W254AZ/WRFX-HD2, began stunting with African American speeches, interspersed with messages such as "Our Voices Will Be Heard" and "Our side of the story is about to be told," with a new format slated to launch on June 30. That day, W254AZ/WRFX-HD2, along with the other fourteen stations, became the launch stations for the Black Information Network, an African American-oriented all-news network.

References

External links

254AZ
Radio stations established in 2014
2014 establishments in North Carolina
IHeartMedia radio stations
Black Information Network stations
All-news radio stations in the United States